Lake Annecy is a perialpine lake in Haute-Savoie in France. It is named after the city of Annecy, which marks the start of the Thiou, Lake Annecy's outflow river.

It is the third-largest lake in France, after the Lac du Bourget and Lac de Grand-Lieu, if the French part of Lake Geneva, which is shared between Switzerland and France, is excluded. It is known as "Europe's cleanest lake" because of strict environmental regulations introduced in the 1960s. It is a popular tourist destination known for its swimming and water sports.

The lake was formed about 18,000 years ago, at the time the large alpine glaciers melted. It is fed by many small rivers from the surrounding mountains (Ire, Eau morte, Laudon, Bornette and Biolon) and a powerful underwater source, the Boubioz, at a 82-metre depth (269 ft).

Cities and towns around the lake
 Annecy
 Veyrier-du-Lac
 Menthon-Saint-Bernard
 Talloires
 Doussard
 Duingt
 Saint-Jorioz
 Sévrier

A cycle path goes partially around Lake Annecy past Sevrier and St Jorioz to Ugine. It has an aim to reach Albertville. The lake is around 14 km long.

See also
 Faverges
 Montmin
 Annecy shootings

References

Further reading
 Jean-Daniel Stanley and Thomas F. Jorstad, Direct Sediment Dispersal from Mountain to Shore, with Bypassing via Three Human-Modified Channel Systems to Lake Annecy, SE France (2004) Vol 20 (4) Journal of Coastal Research pp 958 – 969 JStor.

External links

Official website of Lake Annecy (tourism information center)
Association of the Friends of the Old Annecy (French)
Best Cycling Climbs from Lake Annecy

Annecy
Annecy
Annecy
Tourism in Auvergne-Rhône-Alpes